Grozny (Pḥašə) is a rural locality (a khutor) in Kirovskoye Rural Settlement of Maykopsky District, Russia. The population was 400 as of 2018. There are 2 streets.

References 

Rural localities in Maykopsky District